Hum Log may refer to:

 Hum Log (television series)
 Hum Log (film), a 1951 Bollywood film